The Maritime Silk Road is the maritime portion of the historic Silk Road.

Maritime Silk Road may also refer to:

 21st Century Maritime Silk Road, a Chinese foreign policy initiative
 The Maritime Silk Road (film), a 2011 Iranian movie

See also 
 Silk Road (disambiguation)
 Maritime Silk Route Museum, Guangdong Province, China